Nangere is a Local Government Area in Yobe State, Nigeria.

Geography of Nangere 
Nangere LGA occupies a total area of 980 square kilometres and has an average temperature of 34 °C. The LGA witnesses two major seasons which are the dry and the rainy seasons while the total precipitation in the area is estimated at 890 mm of rainfall per annum.

Population 
It has a total population of 87,823 at the 2006 census.

Postal Code 
It has a postal code of the area is 631.

Towns and Villages 
Other towns and villages that make up Nangere LGA include Dawasa, Tagamasa, Sabon Gari Nangere, Tikau, and Dorowa.

Economy of Nangere 
Majority of Nangere inhabitants engage in Agricultural activities. A variety of crops are grown in the LGA while a number of domestic animals are reared and sold in the area. Trade also flourishes in Nangere LGA with the area hosting several markets where a wide variety of commodities are bought and sold. Other important economic activities engaged in by the people of Nangere LGA include hunting, leather works and crafts making.

See also 
 List of Local Government Areas in Yobe State

References

Local Government Areas in Yobe State